Dewi Weber (born 12 June 1996) is a Dutch professional golfer playing on the LPGA Tour.

Amateur career
Weber was a tennis player in her youth. She played internationally for 2 years, but got injured at 12. That is when she took up golf. By the age of 14, she was selected for the Dutch National Team, and started playing international junior tournaments. In 2012, she represented the Netherlands at the European Young Masters and the European Girls' Team Championship. She played in six European Ladies' Team Championships between 2013 and 2018.

She has also represented the Netherlands in two World Amateur Team Championships, the 2014 Espirito Santo Trophy in Japan and the 2016 Espirito Santo Trophy in Mexico. She played in the 2017 Vagliano Trophy and represented the International team at the 2018 Arnold Palmer Cup.

Weber enrolled at University of Miami in 2015 and played with Miami Hurricanes women's golf. As a freshman, she tied for second behind Virginia Elena Carta at the 2016 NCAA Championship in Eugene, Oregon, finishing with a four-round total of 280 (−8).

In 2016, she lost the final of the British Ladies Amateur to Julia Engström on the 19th hole.

Professional career
Weber turned professional and joined the Symetra Tour in 2019. Over three seasons, she recorded 12 top-10 finishes, with her career-best result a solo fourth at the 2020 Mission Inn Resort and Club Championship.

She earned her card for the 2022 LPGA Tour through qualifying school.

Amateur wins
2013 Dutch National Strokeplay Championship, Netherlands U21 Match Play
2014 Dutch Brabants Open
2015 Dutch National Strokeplay Championship, European Nations Cup (Individual)
2016 Dutch National Strokeplay Championship, Dutch Brabants Open, Mary Fossum Invitational, Betsy Rawls Longhorn Invitational
2018 UCF Challenge

Source:

Team appearances
Amateur
European Young Masters (representing the Netherlands): 2012
European Girls' Team Championship (representing the Netherlands): 2012
European Ladies' Team Championship (representing the Netherlands): 2013, 2014, 2015, 2016, 2017, 2018
Espirito Santo Trophy (representing the Netherlands): 2014, 2016
Vagliano Trophy (representing the continent of Europe): 2017
Arnold Palmer Cup (representing the International team): 2018

Sources:

References

External links

Dewi Weber at the Miami Hurricanes official site

Dutch female golfers
LPGA Tour golfers
Miami Hurricanes women's golfers
Sportspeople from Groningen (city)
1996 births
Living people